Charlton is a village in the parish of Newbottle, Northamptonshire, England in between Brackley and Kings Sutton, lying close to a small tributary of the River Cherwell. At the 2011 census the population was included in the civil parish of Newbottle, with a total population of around 540.

Other nearby villages include Croughton, Aynho and Hinton-in-the-Hedges. The remains of an Iron Age fort, Rainsborough Camp, lie just to the south of the village.

The lawyer and politician F.E. Smith, 1st Earl of Birkenhead lived on Main Street in the village, in a house called The Cottage.  He took as his second peerage title Viscount Furneaux of Charlton, and his ashes are buried in the village cemetery.

References

External links

Villages in Northamptonshire